Mary Tsoni (25 June 1987 – 8 May 2017) was a Greek actress and singer. She was best known for her roles in the films Evil (2005), Dogtooth and Evil: In the Time of Heroes (both 2009). For her role in Dogtooth, she won the award for Best Actress at the Sarajevo Film Festival, and the motion picture itself was nominated for the Academy Award for Best Foreign Language Film.

Born in Livadia, Tsoni was also the lead singer of a punk band called Mary and The Boy and, prior to her acting career, a make-up artist. Tsoni was found dead in her apartment in Exarcheia, Athens on 8 May 2017, a month before her 30th birthday. Her death was revealed to be caused by suicide.

Filmography

References

External links
 
 

1987 births
2017 deaths
21st-century Greek actresses
Actresses from Athens
Greek film actresses
21st-century Greek women singers
Singers from Athens
Respiratory disease deaths in Greece
Deaths from pulmonary edema